Sean Wroe (born 19 March 1985) is an Australian sprinter. He was born in Melbourne to a Japanese Australian mother and is a fluent Japanese speaker.

Wroe competed at the 2008 Summer Olympics in the 400 m and 4 × 400 m relay. He placed 21st in the 400 m semifinal with a time of 45.56 seconds. His team placed sixth in the relay with a time of 3:00.02.

He was part of the team that won the 4 × 400 m relay at the 2006 Commonwealth Games in Melbourne. He anchored the team as they successfully defended their title at the 2010 Commonwealth Games in Delhi. He won silver in the individual event in Delhi.

Major competitions record

References

External links

 
 Sean Wroe profile at IAAF
 

1985 births
Living people
Australian male sprinters
Athletes (track and field) at the 2006 Commonwealth Games
Athletes (track and field) at the 2010 Commonwealth Games
Athletes (track and field) at the 2008 Summer Olympics
Athletes from Melbourne
Olympic athletes of Australia
Australian people of Japanese descent
Commonwealth Games gold medallists for Australia
People educated at St Michael's Grammar School
World Athletics Championships medalists
World Athletics Championships athletes for Australia
Commonwealth Games medallists in athletics
Universiade medalists in athletics (track and field)
Universiade gold medalists for Australia
Universiade silver medalists for Australia
Universiade bronze medalists for Australia
Oceanian Athletics Championships winners
Medalists at the 2007 Summer Universiade
Medalists at the 2009 Summer Universiade
Medalists at the 2011 Summer Universiade
Sportsmen from Victoria (Australia)
Medallists at the 2010 Commonwealth Games